The 1978–79 Connecticut Huskies men's basketball team represented the University of Connecticut in the 1978–79 collegiate men's basketball season. The Huskies completed the season with a 21–8 overall record. The Huskies were an NCAA Division I Independent school for men's basketball this year. They were the ECAC Tournament champions and made it to the second round of the 1979 NCAA Men's Division I Basketball Tournament. The Huskies played their home games at Hugh S. Greer Field House in Storrs, Connecticut and the New Haven Coliseum in New Haven, Connecticut, and were led by second-year head coach Dom Perno.

Schedule 

|-
!colspan=12 style=""| Regular season

|-
!colspan=12 style=""| ECAC tournament

|-
!colspan=12 style=""| NCAA tournament

Schedule Source:

References 

UConn Huskies men's basketball seasons
Connecticut
Connecticut
Connect
Connect